San Jacinto Seminary is the only minor seminary in Cagayan Valley. Founded in 1918, it is located in Alimannao Hills, Peñablanca, Cagayan Valley, under the Archdiocese of Tuguegarao.

References

Catholic seminaries